Vesper Lynd is a fictional character featured in Ian Fleming's 1953 James Bond novel Casino Royale. She was portrayed by Ursula Andress in the 1967 James Bond parody, which is only slightly based on the novel, and by Eva Green in the 2006 film adaptation.

In the novel, the character explains that she was born "on a very stormy evening", and that her parents named her "Vesper", Latin for "evening" and Bond then gives her name to a cocktail he has recently invented. The "Vesper" became popular after the novel's publication. The actual name for the drink (as well as its complete recipe) was mentioned on screen for the first time in the 2006 film adaptation of Casino Royale.

In 1993, journalist Donald McCormick claimed that Fleming based Vesper on the real life of Polish agent Krystyna Skarbek, who was working for Special Operations Executive.

Novel biography
Vesper works at MI6 headquarters as a personal assistant to Head of section S. She is lent to Bond, much to his irritation, to assist him in his mission to bankrupt Le Chiffre, the paymaster of a SMERSH-controlled trade union. She poses as a radio seller, working with secret agent Rene Mathis, and later as Bond's companion to infiltrate the casino in Royale-Les-Eaux, in which Le Chiffre frequently gambles. After Bond takes all of Le Chiffre's money in a high-stakes game of baccarat, Vesper is abducted by Le Chiffre's thugs, who also capture Bond when he tries to rescue her. Both are rescued after Le Chiffre is murdered by a SMERSH agent, but only after Le Chiffre has tortured Bond.

Vesper visits Bond every day in the hospital, and the two grow very close; much to his own surprise, Bond develops genuine feelings for her, and even dreams of leaving the service and marrying her. After he is released from the hospital, they go on a holiday together and eventually become lovers.

Vesper has a terrible secret, however – she is a double agent working for the Russian Ministry of Internal Affairs (MVD) and worked with Bond only because she was ordered to lure him into a trap. (Her kidnapping was staged to lure Bond into Le Chiffre's clutches.) Before she met Bond, she had been romantically involved with a Polish RAF operative. This man had been captured by SMERSH and revealed information about Vesper under torture. Hence, SMERSH was using this operative to blackmail Vesper into helping them. After Le Chiffre's death, she is initially hopeful that she can have a fresh start with Bond, but she realizes this is impossible when she sees a SMERSH operative with an eye patch, Adolph Gettler, tracking her and Bond. Consumed with guilt and certain that SMERSH will find and kill both of them, she commits suicide, leaving a note admitting her treachery and pledging her love to Bond.

Bond deals with his grief over her death by denouncing her as a traitor and going back to work as though nothing has happened, coldly telling his superiors, "The job is done, and the bitch is dead."

However, later books in the series suggest that Bond still has feelings for Vesper. Fleming's tenth novel, On Her Majesty's Secret Service, reveals that Bond makes an annual pilgrimage to Royale-Les-Eaux to visit her grave. In Diamonds Are Forever, Bond skips the song "La Vie En Rose" in Tiffany Case's hotel room "because it has memories for him"; this is a song closely associated with Vesper in Casino Royale. In the novel Goldfinger, when Bond has been poisoned and believes he is about to enter heaven, he worries about how to introduce Tilly Masterton, who he believes has died along with him, to Vesper.

Film biography

1967
In the 1967 version of Casino Royale, Lynd was portrayed by Ursula Andress, who had portrayed another Bond girl, Honey Ryder, in the 1962 film version of Dr. No.

In this version, which bore little resemblance to the novel, Vesper is depicted as a former secret agent who has since become a multi-millionaire with a penchant for wearing ridiculously extravagant outfits at her office ("because if I wore it in the street people might stare"). Bond (played by David Niven), now in the position of M at MI6, uses a discount for her past due taxes to bribe her into becoming another 007 agent, and to recruit baccarat expert Evelyn Tremble (Peter Sellers) into stopping Le Chiffre (played by Orson Welles).

Vesper and Tremble have an affair during which she eliminates an enemy agent sent to seduce Tremble ("Miss Goodthighs"). Ultimately, however, she betrays Tremble to Le Chiffre and SMERSH, declaring to Tremble, "Never trust a rich spy" before killing him with a machine gun hidden inside a bagpipe. She presumably does this for the same reason she does in the novel, as she remarks that it isn't for money but for love. Though her ultimate fate is not revealed in the film, in the closing credits she is shown as an angel playing a harp, showing her to be one of the "seven James Bonds at Casino Royale" killed by an atomic explosion.

Eon films
In the 2006 film version of Casino Royale, Vesper Lynd is a foreign liaison agent from the HM Treasury's Financial Action Task Force assigned to make sure that Bond adequately manages the funds provided by MI6 to bankrupt Le Chiffre (Mads Mikkelsen), a money manager for several terrorist groups. Upon meeting for the first time, Vesper and Bond size each other up, and each deduce that the other is an orphan. Vesper is initially skeptical about Bond's ego and at first is unwilling to act as his girlfriend to distract the other players at the high-stakes Texas Hold 'Em poker tournament hosted by Le Chiffre. However, she assists Bond when Lord's Resistance Army leader Steven Obanno (Isaach de Bankolé) attacks him, knocking a gun out of Obanno's hand and giving Bond the chance to kill him and his bodyguards. 

She retreats to the shower afterwards, wracked with guilt, feeling she has blood on her hands from helping to kill Obanno. Bond sits next to her and comforts her by kissing the "blood" off her fingers, and they return to the casino. His kindness does not prevent her from doing her job, however; she refuses to bankroll him after he loses his table stakes to Le Chiffre. Shortly afterwards, Vesper saves Bond's life. Poisoned by Le Chiffre's girlfriend, Valenka (Ivana Miličević), Bond struggles unsuccessfully to connect a key wire to his automatic external defibrillator and enters cardiac arrest, but Vesper arrives in time to connect the wire properly, enabling the machine to revive him.

After Bond wins the tournament, Le Chiffre kidnaps Vesper, and Bond gives chase. They fall into Le Chiffre's trap and are tortured by him and his thugs, but are saved by the mysterious Mr. White (Jesper Christensen), who shoots and kills Le Chiffre for losing his organisation's money.

While both are hospitalized to recover, Bond and Vesper fall in love, and Bond plans to resign from MI6 to be with her. As in the novel, Bond and Vesper go on vacation to Venice, both of them hoping to start a new life. Unknown to Bond, however, Vesper embezzles the tournament winnings and intends to deliver them to Adolph Gettler (Richard Sammel), who (like his novel counterpart) has been spying on the two agents since they arrived in Venice, and was spotted by Vesper, to her visible dismay. 

When Bond receives a timely phone call from MI6 chief M (Judi Dench) and realizes Vesper's scheme, he pursues her as Gettler takes her hostage and throws her in a caged elevator while he and his men battle Bond. Bond kills Gettler and his thugs, but in the process causes the building to flood and start sinking. After apologizing to Bond, Vesper locks herself in the elevator just before it plunges into the waters below. Bond frantically tries to save her life, but in a final gesture, she kisses Bond's hands as if to clear him of guilt and drowns. Bond finally extricates her and unsuccessfully attempts to revive her.

As in the novel, Bond copes with Vesper's death by denouncing her, saying "The job's done and the bitch is dead." M tells Bond that the organisation behind Le Chiffre had kidnapped Vesper's boyfriend, Yusef Kabeira, and threatened to kill him unless she became their spy. She then tells him that Vesper had made a deal with Kabeira's kidnappers: the money in exchange for Bond's life. When Bond opens Vesper's mobile phone left in their Venice hotel room, he discovers her note for him with Mr. White's phone number which enables Bond to track down and confront him at the movie's end.

In the 2008 film Quantum of Solace, Kabeira (Simon Kassianides) is revealed to be an agent working for Quantum, the terrorist organisation behind Le Chiffre and Mr. White.  Kabeira seduces high-ranking women in the world's intelligence agencies. Kabeira's is then "kidnapped" by Quantum, and the women are forced to become double agents in the hope of securing his freedom. This information vindicates Vesper in Bond's eyes, as he realizes that her betrayal was not her fault. He does not kill Kabeira, but leaves him to MI6 and tells M that she was right about Vesper. As Bond walks away, he drops Vesper's necklace in the snow.

In the 2015 film Spectre, Bond finds a VHS video tape in Mr. White's hotel room in Morocco labelled "Vesper Lynd Interrogation". He chooses to put the tape down and not watch it.

At the beginning of the 2021 film No Time to Die, Bond and Madeleine Swann (Léa Seydoux) are in Matera, Italy. While in a hotel discussing each other's secrets, Swann suggests Bond should visit Vesper's grave. When Bond does so, he says "I miss you" and burns a note saying, "forgive me". Bond notices a card placed by the side of the grave with the SPECTRE symbol. As he picks it up, a bomb intended to kill him detonates. Bond leaves Madeleine at a train station after being attacked by SPECTRE as he believes Madeleine has betrayed him to the organisation. Later, Bond visits Blofeld in prison. Blofeld explains to Bond that he ordered his organisation to follow Bond and Madeleine to Matera knowing that Madeleine would take Bond to Vesper's grave to seek solace, providing an ideal moment to kill Bond.

Related character
The character of Vesper Lynd does not appear in the 1954 television adaptation of Casino Royale. Instead, the character was replaced by a new character named Valerie Mathis (Linda Christian), who is depicted as an American. She also betrays Bond (Barry Nelson), but comes to his rescue after he is shot by Le Chiffre (Peter Lorre). Valerie does not die in this adaptation.

References

Bond girls
Casino Royale (novel)
Characters in British novels of the 20th century
Fictional double agents
Fictional suicides
Literary characters introduced in 1953
Orphan characters in literature
Orphan characters in film